Kalia is an upazila of Narail District in the Division of Khulna, Bangladesh. Kalia Thana was established in 1866 and was converted into an upazila in 1984. It is named after its administrative center, the town of Kalia.

Geography
It borders Lohagara Upazila to the north, Dhaka Division to the east, Bagerhat and Khulna districts to the south, Jessore District to the southwest, and Narail Sadar Upazila to the northwest. The Nabaganga River flows south through the upazila.

Demographics

According to the 2011 Bangladesh census, Kalia Upazila had 48,579 households and a population of 220,202, 16.3% of whom lived in urban areas. 10.8% of the population was under the age of 5. The literacy rate (age 7 and over) was 55.3%, compared to the national average of 51.8%.

Administration
Kalia Upazila is divided into Kalia Municipality and 14 union parishads: Babrahasla, Baioshona, Boronaleliasabad, Chacuri, Hamidpur, Jaynagor, Kalabaria, Khashial, Mauli, Pahardanga, Panchgram, Peroli, Purulia, and Salamabad. The union parishads are subdivided into 111 mauzas and 187 villages.

Kalia Municipality is subdivided into 9 wards and 19 mahallas.

Education

There are five colleges in the upazila. They include Munshi Manik Miah College, and Shaheed Abdus Salam Degree College.

History of the Liberation War
On 8 December 1971, freedom fighters attacked Kalia High School and Municipality house to Pakistani Army and Razakars camp. During the last 3 days (8-10 December), 3 freedom fighters were killed and 4 Pakistani soldiers and 9 Rajakars were killed.

Religious institutions
Mosque 293, Temple 77, Church 1, Tomb 3

Entertainment center

There is located Arunima Eco Park at Panipara, Kalia.

See also
Upazilas of Bangladesh
Districts of Bangladesh
Divisions of Bangladesh

References

 
Upazilas of Narail District